Ariceștii Zeletin is a commune in Prahova County, Muntenia, Romania. It is composed of two villages, Albinari (242 people in 2011) and Ariceștii Zeletin (982 people).

References

Communes in Prahova County
Localities in Muntenia